is a Japanese retired goalball player. She won a bronze medal at the 2004 Summer Paralympics.

She has a congenital retinal disease which caused tunnel vision. Her corrected vision is 20/200, and it wasn't until junior high school that she became aware of her disability.

Personal life
She is married to Paralympic judoka Yuji Kato. The couple lived in Asaka, Saitama.

References 

Paralympic bronze medalists for Japan
Goalball players at the 2004 Summer Paralympics
Goalball players at the 2008 Summer Paralympics
Sportspeople from Tokyo
1980 births
Living people
Medalists at the 2004 Summer Paralympics
Paralympic goalball players of Japan
Female goalball players
Paralympic medalists in goalball
21st-century Japanese women